The 2001 Cardiff Sevens was an rugby sevens tournament that took place at the Rodney Parade with the finals being held at the Millennium Stadium. It took place between 2–3 June 2001 and was the first edition of the Cardiff Sevens and the final round of the 2000–01 World Sevens Series.

Heading into the tournament, New Zealand held an eight point lead over Australia  with a semi-final placing in the cup being enough to give New Zealand the title. After both teams qualified through to the cup knockout stage with them only conceding ten points between the two, they would meet in the cup final with New Zealand taking out not only the Cardiff Sevens but the World Series with a 31–5 win over Australia. In the minor placings, Fiji took out the plate final defeating Wales while England won the bowl over Portugal.

Teams
16 teams participated in the final round of the World Sevens Series:

Format
The teams were drawn into four pools of four teams each. Each team played the other teams in their pool once, with 3 points awarded for a win, 2 points for a draw, and 1 point for a loss (no points awarded for a forfeit). The pool stage was played on the first day of the tournament. The top two teams from each pool advanced to the Cup/Plate brackets. The bottom two teams from each pool went on to the Bowl bracket.

Summary
The opening day of the 2001 Cardiff Sevens saw the leading two nations (Australia and New Zealand) each finished top of their pool group while only conceding five points in their pool stage. The Northern hemisphere teams though had a day that they rather forget with only Wales qualifying through to the quarter-finals of the major European teams with France and Scotland not recording a single win while England only recorded 19-all draw with Spain before losing to the qualifiers of Pool C in Fiji in Georgia. Samoa finished ahead of South Africa in Pool D with the Samoans getting a 28–10 win.

In the cup quarter-finals, New Zealand would take the World Sevens title defeating Wales 29-0 to claim their second World Sevens title. They would also go on to win the Cup final over Australia with tries from Chris Masoe and Damien Karauna securing a 31-5 victory. In the plate-final, Fiji took home the plate defeating host nation Wales who came back from 19-0 down against Georgia in the plate semi-final to win 26-19. England got the remaining two points as they home took the bowl final over Portugal.

Pool stage
The pool stage was played on the first day of the tournament. The 16 teams were separated into four pools of four teams and teams in the same pool played each other once. The top two teams in each pool advanced to the Cup quarterfinals to compete for the 2001 Cardiff Sevens title.

Pool A

Source:

Pool B

Source:

Pool C

Source:

Pool D

Source:

Knockout stage

Bowl

Source:

Plate

Source:

Cup

Source:

Tournament placings

Source: World Rugby

Series standings
At the completion of Round 9:

Source: world.rugby (archived)

References

2000–01 IRB Sevens World Series
2000–01 in Welsh rugby union
June 2001 sports events in the United Kingdom